Max Mirnyi and Serena Williams defeated Mahesh Bhupathi and Mirjana Lučić in the final, 6–4, 6–4, to win the mixed doubles tennis title at the 1998 Wimbledon Championships.

Cyril Suk and Helena Suková were the defending champions, but lost in the first round to Justin Gimelstob and Venus Williams.

Seeds

  Leander Paes /  Larisa Neiland (quarterfinals)
  Paul Haarhuis /  Caroline Vis (semifinals)
  Rick Leach /  Manon Bollegraf (first round)
  Daniel Nestor /  Nathalie Tauziat (third round)
  Mahesh Bhupathi /  Mirjana Lučić (final)
  Patrick Galbraith /  Lisa Raymond (first round)
  Cyril Suk /  Helena Suková (first round)
  David Adams /  Alexandra Fusai (first round)
  Daniel Orsanic /  Patricia Tarabini (first round)
  David Macpherson /  Rachel McQuillan (third round)
  John-Laffnie de Jager /  Katrina Adams (first round)
  Neil Broad /  Mariaan de Swardt (first round)
  David Roditi /  Paola Suárez (first round)
  Menno Oosting /  Sabine Appelmans (first round)
  Piet Norval /  Corina Morariu (first round)
  Brian MacPhie /  Lindsay Davenport (second round)

Draw

Finals

Top half

Section 1

Section 2

Bottom half

Section 3

Section 4

References

External links

1998 Wimbledon Championships on WTAtennis.com
1998 Wimbledon Championships – Doubles draws and results at the International Tennis Federation

X=Mixed Doubles
Wimbledon Championship by year – Mixed doubles